Serbian actor Predrag Miletić on stage and screen:

Career

Theater 
First after graduation, he was invited by Terazije Theatre to play leading role of Antoni in La Mamma, by André Roussin, in 1979.

Opera 

Opera appearances at the National Theatre in Belgrade:

Television 

Currently Miletić appears in "Gorki plodovi", a drama serie on RTS1.

He has also had previous television roles:

Movies 

Predrag Miletić appeared in the following movies:

Commercials 

Predrag Miletić appeared in the following commercials:

See also 
 Predrag Miletić

References 

Miletic, Predrag